was one of the noble surnames bestowed by the Emperors of Japan upon members of the imperial family who were excluded from the line of succession and demoted into the ranks of the nobility since 814. The practice was most prevalent during the Heian period (794–1185 AD), although its last occurrence was during the Sengoku period. The Taira were another such offshoot of the imperial dynasty, making both clans distant relatives.

The Minamoto were one of four great clans that dominated Japanese politics during the Heian, Kamakura, Muromachi and Edo periods of Japanese history—the other three were the Fujiwara, the Taira, and the Tachibana.

History 

In May 814, the first emperor granted the surname Minamoto was Emperor Saga, to his seventh son—Minamoto no Makoto, in Heian-Kyō (modern Kyōto).

The most prominent of the several Minamoto families, the Seiwa Genji, descended from Minamoto no Tsunemoto (897–961), a grandson of Emperor Seiwa. Tsunemoto went to the provinces and became the founder of a major warrior dynasty. Minamoto no Mitsunaka (912–997) formed an alliance with the Fujiwara. Thereafter the Fujiwara frequently called upon the Minamoto to restore order in the capital, Heian-Kyō (modern Kyōto).

Mitsunaka's eldest son, Minamoto no Yorimitsu (948–1021), became the protégé of Fujiwara no Michinaga; another son, Minamoto no Yorinobu (968–1048) suppressed the rebellion of Taira no Tadatsune in 1032. Yorinobu's son, Minamoto no Yoriyoshi (988–1075), and grandson, Minamoto no Yoshiie (1039–1106), pacified most of northeastern Japan between 1051 and 1087.

The Seiwa Genji's fortunes declined in the Hōgen Rebellion (1156), when the Taira executed most of the line, including Minamoto no Tameyoshi. During the Heiji Disturbance (1160), the head of the Seiwa Genji, Minamoto no Yoshitomo, died in battle. Taira no Kiyomori seized power in Kyoto by forging an alliance with the retired emperors Go-Shirakawa and Toba and infiltrating the kuge. He sent Minamoto no Yoritomo (1147–1199), the third son of Minamoto no Yoshimoto of the Seiwa Genji, into exile. In 1180, during the Genpei War, Yoritomo mounted a full-scale rebellion against the Taira rule, culminating in the destruction of the Taira and the subjugation of eastern Japan within five years. In 1192 he received the title shōgun and set up the first bakufu at Kamakura.

The later Ashikaga (founders of the Ashikaga shogunate), Nitta, and Takeda clans claim descent from the Seiwa Genji.

The protagonist of the classical Japanese novel The Tale of Genji, Hikaru Genji, was bestowed the name Minamoto for political reasons by his father the emperor and was delegated to civilian life and a career as an imperial officer.

The Genpei War is also the subject of the early Japanese epic The Tale of the Heike (Heike Monogatari).

Members of the Minamoto clan (Genji clan) 

Even within royalty there was a distinction between princes with the title  ("[having the] ability to advance", i.e., eligible to become the new Emperor), who could ascend to the throne, and princes with the title  ("king", "ruler", "magnate"), who were not members of the line of imperial succession but nevertheless remained members of the royal class (and therefore outranked members of Minamoto clans).  The bestowing of the Minamoto name on a (theretofore-)prince or his descendants excluded them from the royal class altogether, thereby operating as a reduction in legal and social rank even for ō-princes not previously in the line of succession.

Many later clans were formed by members of the Minamoto clan, and in many early cases, progenitors of these clans are known by either family name. There are also known monks of Minamoto descent; these are often noted in genealogies but did not carry the clan name (in favour of a dharma name).

There were 21 branches of the clan, each named after the emperor from whom it descended. Some of these lineages were populous, but a few produced and no descendants.

Saga Genji
The Saga Genji are descendants of Emperor Saga. As Saga had many children, many were bestowed the uji Minamoto, declassing them from imperial succession. Among his sons, Makoto, Tokiwa, and Tōru took the position of Minister of the Left (sadaijin); they were among the most powerful in the Imperial Court in the early Heian period. Some of Tōru's descendants in particular settled the provinces and formed buke. Clans such as the Watanabe, Matsuura, and Kamachi descend from the Saga Genji.

Noted Saga Genji and descendants include:
 Makoto, seventh son of the Emperor
 Hiromu, eighth son of the Emperor
 Hitoshi, grandson of Hiromu
 Tokiwa, son of the Emperor
 Okoru, first son of Tokiwa
 Sadamu, son of the Emperor
 Shitagō, great-grandson of Sadamu
 Hiroshi, son of the Emperor
 Tōru, son of the Emperor
 Anbō (secular name Minamoto no Shitagō), great-grandson of Tōru
 Watanabe no Tsuna (his official name was Minamoto no Tsuna, who resided at Watanabe in Settsu province, and took the name of the place), great-great-grandson of Tōru
 Matsuura Hisashi, great-grandson of Tsuna
 Koreshige, grandson of Tōru
 Mitsusue, great-great-grandson of Koreshige
 Tsutomu, son of the Emperor
 Hiraku, son of the Emperor

History records indicate that at least three of Emperor Saga's daughters were also made Minamoto (Kiyohime, Sadahime, and Yoshihime), but few records concerning his daughters are known.

Ninmyō Genji
They were descendants of Emperor Ninmyō. His sons Masaru and Hikaru were udaijin. Among Hikaru's descendants was Minamoto no Atsushi, adoptive father of the Saga Genji's Watanabe no Tsuna and father of the Seiwa Genji's Mitsunaka's wife.

Montoku Genji
These were descendants of Emperor Montoku. Among them, Yoshiari was a sadaijin, and among his descendants were the Sakado clan who were Hokumen no Bushi.

Seiwa Genji

These were descendants of Emperor Seiwa. The most numerous of them were those descended from Tsunemoto, son of Prince Sadazumi. Hachimantarō Yoshiie of the Kawachi Genji was a leader of a buke. His descendants set up the Kamakura shogunate, making his a prestigious pedigree claimed by many buke, particularly for the direct descendants in the Ashikaga clan (that set up the Ashikaga shogunate) and the rival Nitta clan. Centuries later, Tokugawa Ieyasu would claim descent from the Seiwa Genji by way of the Nitta clan.

Yōzei Genji
These were descendants of Emperor Yōzei. While Tsunemoto is termed the ancestor of the Seiwa Genji, there is evidence (rediscovered in the late 19th century by Hoshino Hisashi) suggesting that he was actually the grandson of Yōzei rather than of Seiwa. This theory is not widely accepted as fact, but as Yōzei was deposed for reprehensible behavior, there would have been a compelling motive to claim descent from more auspicious origins if it were the case.

Kōkō Genji
These were descendants of Emperor Kōkō. The great-grandson of his firstborn Prince Koretada, Kōshō, was the ancestor of a line of busshi, from which various styles of Buddhist sculpture emerged. Kōshō's grandson Kakujo established the Shichijō Bussho workshop.

Uda Genji
These were descendants of Emperor Uda. Two sons of Prince Atsumi, Masanobu and Shigenobu became sadaijin. Masanobu's children in particular flourished, forming five dōjō houses as kuge, and as buke the Sasaki clan of the Ōmi Genji, and the Izumo Genji.

Daigo Genji
These were descendants of Emperor Daigo. His son Takaakira became a sadaijin, but his downfall came during the Anna incident. Takaakira's descendants include the Okamoto and Kawajiri clans. Daigo's grandson Hiromasa was a reputed musician.

Murakami Genji
These were descendants of Emperor Murakami. His grandson Morofusa was an udaijin and had many descendants, among them several houses of dōjō kuge. Until the Ashikaga clan took it during the Muromachi period, the title of Genji no Chōja always fell to one of Morofusa's progeny.

Reizei Genji
These were descendants of Emperor Reizei. Though they are included among the listing of 21 Genji lineages, no concrete record of the names of his descendants made Minamoto is known to survive.

Kazan Genji
These were descendants of Emperor Kazan. They became the dōjō Shirakawa family, which headed the Jingi-kan for centuries, responsible for the centralized aspects of Shinto.

Sanjō Genji
These were descendants of Emperor Sanjō's son Prince Atsuakira. Starting with one of them, Michisue, the position of Ōkimi-no-kami (chief genealogist of the imperial family) in the Ministry of the Imperial Household was passed down hereditarily.

Go-Sanjō Genji
These were descendants of Emperor Go-Sanjō's son Prince Sukehito. Sukehito's son Arihito was a sadaijin. Minamoto no Yoritomo's vassal Tashiro Nobutsuna, who appears in the Tale of the Heike, was allegedly Arihito's grandson (according to the Genpei Jōsuiki).

Go-Shirakawa Genji
This line consisted solely of Emperor Go-Shirakawa son Mochihito-ō (Takakura-no-Miya). As part of the succession dispute that led to the opening hostilities of the Genpei War, he was declassed (renamed "Minamoto no Mochimitsu") and exiled.

Juntoku Genji
These were descendants of Emperor Juntoku's sons Tadanari-ō and Prince Yoshimune. The latter's grandson Yoshinari rose to sadaijin with the help of Ashikaga Yoshimitsu.

Go-Saga Genji
This line consisted solely of Emperor Go-Saga's grandson Prince Koreyasu. Koreyasu-ō was installed as a puppet shōgun (the seventh of the Kamakura shogunate) at a young age, and was renamed "Minamoto no Koreyasu" a few years later. After he was deposed, he regained royal status, and became a monk soon after, thereby losing the Minamoto name.

Go-Fusakusa Genji
These were descendants of Emperor Go-Fukakusa's son Prince Hisaaki (the eighth shōgun of the Kamakura shogunate). Hisaaki's sons Prince Morikuni (the next shōgun) and Prince Hisayoshi were made Minamoto. Hisayoshi's adopted "nephew" (actually Nijō Michihira's son) Muneaki became a gon-dainagon (acting dainagon).

Ōgimachi Genji
These were non-royal descendants of Emperor Ōgimachi. At first they were buke, but they later became dōjō-ke, the Hirohata family.

Legacy 

 Kamakura city since Kamakura shogunate, which was established by Shogun Minamoto no Yoritomo.

 Three Genji Shrines (源氏三神社 Genji San Jinja) - A group of Shinto shrines connected closedly with the members of Seiwa Genji of the Minamoto clan.
 Rokusonnō Shrine, Minami-ku, Kyoto, Kyoto Prefecture
 Tada Jinja, Kawanishi, Hyōgo Prefecture
 Tsuboi Hachimangū, Habikino, Osaka Prefecture
Sasaki Shrine (沙沙貴神社 Sasaki Jinja) - a Shinto shrine connected closely with the members of Uda Genji of the Minamoto clan.

See also 
History of Japan
Japanese clans
Japanese name
Minamoto (surname)
Taira clan
Genpei war
Fujiwara clan

References

External links

Heian Period: Minamoto Clan history
Official site of Rokusonnō Shrine
Official site of Tada Shrine
Official site of Tsuboi Hachimangu
Official site of Sasaki Shrine

 
Heian period
Japanese clans
Imperial House of Japan
Japan
Japanese people